Jack Armer (born 16 April 2001) is a professional footballer who plays for Carlisle United, as a defender. Born in England, he has represented Scotland at youth international level.

Early and personal life
Born in Preston, Armer is from Penwortham and has Scottish descent on his mother's side of the family.

Club career
Armer joined Preston North End at the age of seven and turned professional in May 2019. He moved on loan to Lancaster City in August 2019. After the loan ended in December 2019, he returned to the club for a second loan spell in January 2020.

He was released by Preston at the end of the 2019–20 season, and signed for Carlisle United in August 2020.

International career
he was called-up but the Scotland under-19 team in February 2020. He had previously played for Scotland at under-17 and under-18 levels.

Career statistics

References

2001 births
Living people
English people of Scottish descent
English footballers
Scottish footballers
Preston North End F.C. players
Lancaster City F.C. players
Carlisle United F.C. players
Northern Premier League players
English Football League players
Association football defenders
Scotland youth international footballers